Askewville is a town in Bertie County, North Carolina, United States.  The population was 241 at the 2010 census.

Geography
Askewville is located at  (36.113038, -76.940424).

Demographics

As of the census of 2000, there were 180 people, 75 households, and 60 families residing in the town. The population density was 305.1 people per square mile (117.8/km2). There were 85 housing units at an average density of 144.1/sq mi (55.6/km2). The racial makeup of the town was 98.89% White and 1.11% Native American.

There were 75 households, out of which 29.3% had children under the age of 18 living with them, 70.7% were married couples living together, 5.3% had a female householder with no husband present, and 18.7% were non-families. 18.7% of all households were made up of individuals, and 9.3% had someone living alone who was 65 years of age or older. The average household size was 2.40 and the average family size was 2.72.

In the town, the population was spread out, with 18.3% under the age of 18, 6.1% from 18 to 24, 28.9% from 25 to 44, 33.9% from 45 to 64, and 12.8% who were 65 years of age or older. The median age was 43 years. For every 100 females, there were 85.6 males. For every 100 females age 18 and over, there were 86.1 males.

The median income for a household in the town was $38,333, and the median income for a family was $42,917. Males had a median income of $28,333 versus $24,583 for females. The per capita income for the town was $18,184. About 8.7% of families and 10.8% of the population were below the poverty line, including 3.3% of those under the age of eighteen and 34.0% of those 65 or over.

References

Towns in North Carolina
Towns in Bertie County, North Carolina